Kayle “Kyle” Blignaut (born 9 November 1999) is a South African athlete who specialises in the shot put.

Blignaut won the gold medal at the 2018 IAAF World U20 Championships in Tampere. In May 2021 he threw a 21.21m personal best to meet the qualifying standard for the delayed 2020 Tokyo Olympics during the USSA (South African Universities) Championships in Johannesburg. The throw put him fourth on the South Africa all time list.

References

1999 births
Living people
South African male shot putters
Sportspeople from Johannesburg
Athletes (track and field) at the 2019 African Games
African Games competitors for South Africa
Athletes (track and field) at the 2020 Summer Olympics
Olympic athletes of South Africa
20th-century South African people
21st-century South African people